The Coupe de France Final 1994 was a football match held at Parc des Princes, Paris on May 14, 1994, that saw AJ Auxerre defeat Montpellier HSC 3-0 thanks to goals by Moussa Saïb, Gérald Baticle and Corentin Martins.

Match details

See also
Coupe de France 1993-94

External links
Coupe de France results at Rec.Sport.Soccer Statistics Foundation
Report on French federation site

Coupe
1994
Coupe De France Final 1994
Coupe De France Final 1994
Coupe de France Final
Coupe de France Final